Deccan Radio was a community radio station in Hyderabad, India, operating on 107.8 MHz FM. The station was licensed to the Abid Ali Khan Educational Trust and broadcast a limited schedule of community programs. 

The station had evidently ceased regular broadcasting around 2015. The result was a complaint from Charminar, which claimed Deccan's broadcasts and consequent interference made advertisers hesitant to purchase air time on the other station.

References

Radio stations in Hyderabad
Community radio stations in India
Defunct radio stations

Radio stations established in 2009 
Radio stations disestablished in 2015 
Defunct mass media in India